John Ira Burton High School is a high school located in the City of Norton, Virginia, United States. A part of Norton City Schools, it has an enrollment of approximately 320 students.

Building 
The school was built in 1953 and named in honor of John Ira Burton, who served as principal of the local schools for 38 years. It has a classroom capacity of 615 students.

In 2008, major structural enhancements were made on the Lawson-Fitchko Stadium. They were completed on August 22 for the Raiders' first home football game of the season, against Rye Cove High School.

On September 18, 2008, the school dedicated the Rickie M. Harris Athletic Complex. The facility was named in honor of Rickie M. Harris, a former student and school athlete who died five years prior as a result of an auto accident.

Athletics 
The Raider football team competed in the Virginia state finals three times between 2003–2006 and won the state title in 1972. In the 2006 state finals the Raiders came close to a second state title, finishing with a score of 21-20 against the Riverheads Gladiators from Staunton, Virginia.

The school's marching band competes in several regional competitions and the band performed at the halftime performance for the 2017 Sugar Bowl in New Orleans, Louisiana.

In March 2011, the school's Lady Raider Basketball team won its first state championship, defeating Sussex Central 65-54 in the VHSL Group A, Division 1 final.

John I. Burton wrestler Colby Dean became a four-time VHSL A State Champion  from 2010-2013, becoming at the time just the third wrestler in Group A history to win four state championships.

Academics 

In 2018, the school had a dropout percentage of 0.81%. In that same year, 70% of the school's graduating class enrolled in a postsecondary Institution of Higher Education (IHE) within sixteen months of graduating. In the 2010–2011 school year, John I. Burton was in one of only four school divisions in the state that made AYP (average yearly progress) as set by guidelines in the No Child Left Behind Act of 2002, a former national education mandate.

References

External links
Official site
 
 
 Norton City Schools

Public high schools in Virginia
Norton, Virginia
Educational institutions established in 1953
1953 establishments in Virginia